BCE is an abbreviation meaning Before Common Era, an alternative to the use of BC.

BCE, B.C.E. or bce may also refer to:
 Bachelor of Civil Engineering
 Banco Central del Ecuador
 Basic Chess Endings, a book by Reuben Fine
 BCE Inc., formerly Bell Canada Enterprises
 BCE Place, Toronto, Canada, later Brookfield Place
 Bracknell railway station, Berkshire, UK, code
 Bhagalpur College of Engineering
 Entity-control-boundary, an architectural pattern used in software design

See also